Rapp–Hodgkin syndrome was formerly thought to be a unique autosomal dominant disorder due to a P63 gene mutation. However, it was recently shown to the same disease as Hay–Wells syndrome.

It was first characterized in 1968.

See also 
 Punctate porokeratosis
 List of cutaneous conditions

References

Further reading 
  GeneReviews/NCBI/NIH/UW entry on Ankyloblepharon-Ectodermal Defects-Cleft Lip/Palate Syndrome or AEC Syndrome, Hay–Wells Syndrome. Includes: Rapp–Hodgkin Syndrome

External links 

  OMIM entries on AEC

Genodermatoses
Rare syndromes